Hoher Dachstein is a strongly karstic mountain in central Austria and the second-highest mountain in the Northern Limestone Alps. It is situated at the border of Upper Austria and Styria, and is the highest point in each of those states. Parts of the massif also lie in the state of Salzburg, leading to the mountain being referred to as the Drei-Länder-Berg ("three-state mountain").

Seen from the north, the Dachstein massif is dominated by glaciers with rocky summits rising beyond them. By contrast, to the south, the mountain drops almost vertically to the valley floor.

Geology
The geology of the Dachstein massif is dominated by the Dachstein-Kalk Formation ("Dachstein limestone"), dating from Triassic times. In common with other karstic areas, the Dachstein is permeated by a rich cave system, including some of the largest caves in Austria, such as the Mammuthhöhle and the Hirlatzhöhle. Another significant tourist destination is the Eisriesenhöhle.  The Dachstein is famous for its fossils, including Megalodonts; the Linzer Weg leads over many such fossils, which are referred to as Kuhtritte ("cattle footprints").

Glaciers are uncommon in the Northern Limestone Alps, and those on the Dachstein — the Hallstätter Gletscher ("Hallstatt glacier"), the Großer Gosaugletscher ("great Gosau glacier") and the Schladminger Gletscher ("Schladming glacier") — are the largest, as well as being the northernmost and the easternmost in the whole of the Alps. Several smaller ice-fields also exist, such as the Kleine Gosaugletscher ("lesser Gosau glacier") and the Schneelochgletscher ("snow-hole glacier"). The glaciers are retreating rapidly, and may disappear entirely within 80 years. The Hallstatt glacier withdrew by 20 m in the year 2003 alone. By 2018, it is estimated that the glacier has retreated more than 1 km since 1908.

Climbing
The summit was first reached on July 18, 1834 by Peter Karl Thurwieser, guided by the brothers Adam and Peter Gappmayr, via the Gosau glacier, after an earlier attempt by Erzherzog Karl via the Hallstätter glacier had failed.  A wooden cross was erected at the summit during this ascent. The question of the first successful ascent has been a matter of controversial discussion even in contemporary newspaper articles. Two potential summit successes occurred in 1819 and 1823 by Jakob Buchsteiner, the latter of which is today thought to be the first ascent of neighbouring Torstein. The first person to reach the summit in winter was Friedrich Simony, on 14 January 1847.  The sheer southern face was first climbed on 22 September 1909 by the brothers Irg and Franz Steiner.

Being the highest point of two different Bundesländer, the summit is a popular goal in both summer and winter. In fine weather as many as 100 climbers may be attempting the ascent, leading to congestion at key sections of the climb.

Routes
The best-known routes are
 Schulter-Anstieg: Simony Hütte - Hallstatt glacier - Dachsteinwarte - east ridge
 Randkluft-Anstieg: Simony Hütte - Hallstatt glacier - north-east face
 West ridge: Adamekhütte - Gosau glacier - Obere Windluke - west ridge
These routes require basic alpine equipment for crossing the glaciers and knowledge of climbing. The more interesting climbing routes are concentrated on the south face, the most famous among them being the Steinerweg (graded V) and the Pichlweg (graded IV).

See also
 Limestone Alps
 List of mountains of the Alps
 List of European ultra prominent peaks
List of World Heritage Sites in Austria

References

External links

 
 "Hoher Dachstein, Austria" on Peakbagger

Mountains of the Alps
World Heritage Sites in Austria
Dachstein Mountains
Mountains of Upper Austria
Mountains of Styria
Mountains of Salzburg (state)